Saint Joseph College (Kolese Santo Yusup (abb. KOSAYU) or Hwa Ind in Tionghua Indonesia) is a privately owned Catholic school in Malang, East Java, Indonesia, providing education to students from kindergarten to senior high level.

History

On 16 January 1951, Father Joseph Wang, CDD was ordered by the bishop of Malang to develop a Catholic school for the Chinese students who, at the time, were learning in a Chinese school. Father Joseph Wang, affectionately called simply Father Wang, was a priest from the Congregation of the Lord's Disciples (CDD: Congregatio Discipulorum Domini).

He purchased a run-down building, previously the Dutch Neutrale Lagere School, on a land with an area of 5000m². The property is situated at 35 Dr. Soetomo Street, Malang. On 15 July 1951, the school unofficially opened under the name Roman Catholic Indonesian Chinese Secondary School (SM-RK Hwa Ind: Sekolah Menengah Roma Katolik Tionghua Indonesia). Two days later, the school began its first lessons to four students. The official opening of the school was carried out by Monsignor AEJ. Albers, O. Carm. on 19 March 1952; this is the date used as the school's anniversary.

On 4 January 1954, Father Wang opened one class for senior high school students with an enrolment of 27 students. On 1 December 1959, the school's name was changed to Saint Joseph College. On 1 September 1974, another campus was opened in the Blimbing area for the senior high school students. The school was named Saint Joseph Senior High School (SMAK Kolese Santo Yusup). At the time there were nine classes, but this has since increased to 29 classes for the senior high school students.

Campus

Saint Joseph College is divided into two campuses, the Soetomo campus (situated at Jalan Dr. Soetomo number 35, Malang) and the Blimbing campus (situated at Jalan Simpang Borobudur number 1, Malang). The Soetomo campus enrolls students from the kindergarten to the junior high level while the Blimbing campus enrolls students from the elementary to the senior high level.

Saint Joseph College Soetomo Campus
The principal of Saint Joseph College Junior High School I (Soetomo) is Maria Monica Tjong Mei Tjien, with the vice principal, Irma Susanti.
The principal before that is Lindung Ratwiawan, along with the same vice principal, Irma Susanti.

Saint Joseph College Blimbing Campus
Past and current principals of Saint Joseph College Senior High School are:
Father Joseph Wang, CDD (1954 - 1973)
 G. Soewandi (1974 - 1984)
Father Hilarius Sutiono, CDD (1984 - 2004)
 Peter Bento Sihombing (2004-2014)
 Petrus Harjanto (2014-present)

Current vice principals of Saint Joseph College Senior High School are:
Vice Principal of Student Affairs: Mr. Stanislaus Tricahyono
Vice Principal of Public Affairs: Mr. Wisnu Wiyono Sakti
Vice Principal of Facilities and Infrastructure: Romo Antonius Hermanto, CDD
Vice Principal of Curriculum: Ms. A.M.M. Lindayanti

Facilities

In 1958, the Blimbing campus opened a residential college for boys, and in 1979 for girls. The residential colleges can accommodate 280 students.

The Blimbing campus (senior high school area) has the following facilities:
Chapel
Physics lab, biology lab, chemistry lab, language lab, and computer labs
Basketball and volleyball fields
Green House

The Blimbing campus is developing a three-storey multi-purpose building:
Ground level is for the food centre (under construction).
Middle level is for band and choir practice, for multimedia practice and is equipped with three conference rooms.
Uppermost level is for badminton and table tennis practice, which doubles as a mass meeting location for the students as it has the capacity to hold 1,300 people.

The building also contains a multi-level library.

The school owns a spiritual retreat house in Sawiran, Nongkojajar. The complex is located in a quiet and remote hilly area (on the way to Mount Bromo), housing 150 people.

The school owns a clinic, an organic horticulture farm, a co-op, and a publishing company.

See also
Malang
Saint Joseph

External links
Official senior high school website (in Indonesian)

Schools in Indonesia 
Catholic schools in Indonesia
Malang
Schools in East Java